Jarosław Wołkonowski is a Polish-Lithuanian historian, Doctor of Philosophy with  Habilitation affiliated with the University of Białystok (in Białystok, Poland, where he holds the title of university professor) and University of Vilnius (in Vilnius, Lithuania, where he lives). He is the president of Association of Polish  Scientists in Lithuania (Związek Naukowców Polskich na Litwie, sometimes Stowarzyszenie Naukowców Polskich na Litwie).

His interests and research are centered on history of Poland and history of Lithuania, particularly the Polish-Lithuanian relations during the World War II; interactions between Polish and Lithuanian ethnic groups in the Vilnius region and issues involving Polish Secret State and Armia Krajowa operations in that region.

Works
Sympozjum historyczne “Rok 1944 na Wileńszczyźnie”: Wilno 30 czerwca–1 lipca 1994r. (ed.), Warsaw: Biblioteka “Kuriera Wileńskiego,” 1996,
Okręg Wileński Związku Walki Zbrojnej - Armii Krajowej w latach 1939-1945, Warszawa 1996
Stosunki polsko-żydowskie w Wilnie i na Wilenszczyznie 1919-1939, Wydawnictwo Uniwersytetu w Białymstoku, 2004,

External links
Zakład Historii Państwa i Prawa UB

Year of birth missing (living people)
Living people
Historians of Lithuania
20th-century Polish historians
Polish male non-fiction writers
Academic staff of the University of Białystok
Academic staff of Vilnius University
21st-century Polish historians